Ade Adekola (born 1966), is a Nigerian multidisciplinary conceptual artist. He is known as a photographer, painter, textile artist, digital artist, and writer. He lives in Lagos. 

Ade Adekola was born on 3 March 1966 in Nigeria. He graduated in 1992 with a degree in architecture from the Architectural Association School of Architecture in London, and trained at the University of Manchester beforehand.

References

External links 
 Official website

Nigerian artists
Nigerian painters
Abstract artists
1966 births
Living people
People from Lagos
Contemporary painters
Residents of Lagos